The T1 or Lusaka–Livingstone Road is the main highway of the Southern Province of Zambia. The entire route is part of Trans-African Highway network number 4 or Cairo-Cape Town Highway between Cairo and Cape Town.

Route

It is entirely in the Southern Province of Zambia. It is a magnificent scenic road with views throughout.

The T1 begins in Chikankata District, at the Turnpike junction with the T2 road (Great North Road) just south of the Kafue River Bridge (55 kilometres south of Lusaka; 10 kilometres south of Kafue) (adjacent to the Kafue Weighbridge).

It enters Mazabuka in a northerly direction. By ABSA Bank, the T1 turns westwards and by Mazabuka Police Station, the T1 turns northwards. It is one road for the remainder of its length to Livingstone.

North of Mazabuka town centre, the road turns west and then south-west.

In Choma, the T1 meets the M11 Road, which connects Choma with Namwala and the Itezhi-Tezhi Dam. Just before the Daniel Munkombwe Toll Plaza, the T1 meets a road (D356) connecting southwards to Sinazongwe by Lake Kariba.

In Kalomo, the T1 meets a road which heads to the southern part of the Kafue National Park (Dundumwezi Gate).

South of Livingstone City Centre, the T1 Road meets the eastern terminus of the M10 Road, which connects Livingstone with Kazungula (Botswana Border Post), Sesheke (Namibia Border Post) and Mongu.

The T1 continues southwards for another  to the Victoria Falls, where it crosses the Zambezi River via the Victoria Falls Bridge into the Republic of Zimbabwe, where it becomes the A8 Road to Bulawayo. The town on the other side of the Zambezi River crossing is also named Victoria Falls.

Road Network

This route is entirely part of Trans-African Highway number 4 or Cairo-Cape Town Highway, which links Cairo in Egypt with Gaborone in Botswana and Cape Town in South Africa. It is also part of the Walvis Bay-Ndola-Lubumbashi Development Road.

It is also part of the route that motorists and heavy cargo trucks from Botswana, Namibia and parts of South Africa use to reach Lusaka, Zambia's capital city. From Lusaka, this traffic continues to the north and east, including to Tanzania, Malawi and the Democratic Republic of the Congo.

As a result, the road may be very busy and occupied with trucks, cars and buses, in either direction. As the road is one lane in each direction, heavy traffic and traffic jams are common.

Great North Road 

This road connecting Lusaka and Livingstone (which was the capital of the nation before 1935) was originally regarded as being part of the Great North Road of Zambia. Then, after the capital of the nation became Lusaka in 1935, Lusaka was regarded as the southern terminus of the Great North Road and this road connecting Lusaka to Livingstone was no-longer regarded as part of the route.

See also 
 Great North Road, Zambia
 Transport in Zambia
 Roads in Zambia

References

Camerapix (1996). "Spectrum Guide to Zambia." Nairobi: Camerapix International Publishing. .
Terracarta/International Travel Maps, Vancouver Canada: "Zambia, 2nd edition", 2000.

External links
 Crossing Lusaka to Livingstone

Roads in Zambia
Transport in Zambia
Southern Province, Zambia